Stillness in Motion: Vai Live in L.A. is a live album by American virtuoso guitarist Steve Vai, released on 7 April 2015, on the Sony Music Entertainment and Legacy Recordings labels.

The album features a recording of a performance by Vai in October 2012 at Club Nokia in Los Angeles, which was part of the Story of Light world tour; it was the 49th show on this tour.

Track listing

Disc 1
 Intro/Racing the World
 Velorum
 Band Intros
 Building the Church
 Tender Surrender
 Gravity Storm
 Weeping China Doll
 John the Revelator
 The Moon and I
 The Animal
 Whispering a Prayer

Disc 2
 The Audience Is Listening
 Rescue Me or Bury Me
 Sisters
 Treasure Island
 Salamanders In the Sun
 Pusa Road
 Frank
 The Ultra Zone (CD Version)
 Build Me a Song L.A.
 For The Love of God
 Taurus Bulba

Personnel
Steve Vai – Guitar, vocals
Dave Weiner – Guitar, keyboards, vocals 
Philip Bynoe – Bass, vocals
Jeremy Colson – Drums, vocals
Deborah Henson-Conant – Electric harp, vocals 
Beverly McClellan – Vocals

References

Steve Vai albums
2015 live albums
Live instrumental rock albums
Sony Music live albums
Legacy Recordings live albums